M. S. Mani may refer to:
 M. S. Mani (politician), Indian politician
 M. S. Mani (film editor), film director and editor in Malayalam cinema
 Mahadeva Subramania Mani (1908–2003), Indian entomologist